These are the results of the women's 200 metres event at the 1997 World Championships in Athletics in Athens, Greece.

Medalists

Records

Results

Heats
6 August

Second round
6 August

Semifinals
7 August

Final
8 August

References
 Results
 IAAF

- Women's 200 Metres, 1997 World Championships In Athletics
200 metres at the World Athletics Championships
1997 in women's athletics